Mohamed Bey El Mouradi (died October 14, 1696) was a Muradid leader and Bey of Tunis from 1686 until his death. He was the eldest son of Murad II Bey.

Despite the troubled times, he was responsible for building several monuments in Tunis including the M'hamed Bey Mosque (Sidi Mahrez Mosque), modelled on the mosques of Istanbul with a great central dome, In addition the construction of many buildings of worship and education within the country he ordered construction works in Beja, El Kef, Gafsa, Tozeur and Gabès. In 1690 Mohamed Bey built a bridge between Tebourba and Medjerda.

He died on October 14, 1696 and was buried in the mausoleum of his grandfather Hammuda Pasha Bey. He was survived by two sons, Mourad and Hassan, but as they were too young to reign his brother, Romdhane Bey, inherited his estate.

References

Bibliography
Ibn Abi Dhiaf, Présent des hommes de notre temps. Chroniques des rois de Tunis et du pacte fondamental, vol. II, éd. Maison tunisienne de l'édition, Tunis, 1990

Beys of Tunis
1696 deaths
Muradid dynasty
Year of birth unknown